Builsa North Municipal District is one of the fifteen districts in Upper East Region, Ghana. Originally it was formerly part of the then-larger Builsa District in 1988, until the southern part of the district was split off to create Builsa South District on 29 February 2008; thus the remaining part has been renamed as Builsa North District, which it was later elevated to municipal district assembly status on 19 December 2018 to become Builsa North Municipal District. The municipality is located in the western part of Upper East Region and has Sandema as its capital town.

Builsa tribe
The majority of the inhabitants are of the Builsa tribe, the original early settlers of the area. It also has a significant population of the Kantosi whom dominantly reside in Sandema.

Education
There are numerous basic schools in Builsa North Municipality, including three Senior High Schools (SHS) of which two are public i.e. the Sandema Senior High School and the Sandema Senior High Technical School. The third privately owned is the Wiaga Senior High School, a community SHS in Wiaga.  The Youth Leadership Training Institute is a vocational institution also located in Sandema, the district capital.

Economy
The economic structure of the Builsa North District is dominated by an agrarian subsistence economy. Industry is scarce, and tourism has not yet developed.

Villages
The capital and largest town in the Builsa North District is Sandema. The Builsa North District encompasses the following villages:

 Bachonsa
 Chuchuliga
 Doninga
 Fumbisi
 Gbedema
 Gbedembilisi
 Kadema
 Kanjarga
 Siniensi
 Uwasa
 Vaari
 Wiaga
 Wiesi

Sources
 
 GhanaDistricts.com

Further reading
 Schott, Rüdiger (1977). "Sources for a History of the Bulsa in Northern Ghana". Paideuma: Mitteilungen zur Kulturkunde, Bd. 23 (1977), pp. 141–168.

References

Districts of Upper East Region